Spotlight Sadie is a lost 1919 American silent film drama directed by Laurence Trimble and starring Mae Marsh and Wallace MacDonald. It was produced and distributed by Goldwyn Pictures. It was alternately known as The Saintly Show Girl.

Cast
Mae Marsh as Sadie Sullivan
Wallace MacDonald as Dick Carrington
Mary Thurman as Hazel Harris
Betty Schade as Dollie Delmar
Alec B. Francis as Reverend John Page
Walter Hiers as Jack Mills
Philo McCullough as Reggie Delmar
Wellington Playter as O'Keefe
Lou Salter as Nancy O'Keefe
Richard Carlyle
Alice Davenport

References

External links

Cluster lobby cards set (archived)
Singular photo card of Mae Marsh and Wallace MacDonald (archived)

1919 films
American silent feature films
Lost American films
Goldwyn Pictures films
American black-and-white films
Silent American drama films
1919 drama films
1919 lost films
Lost drama films
Films directed by Laurence Trimble
1910s American films
1910s English-language films